Lyncina sulcidentata, common name the square-toothed cowry or groove-toothed cowry, is a species of sea snail, a cowry, a marine gastropod mollusk in the family Cypraeidae, the cowries.

Description
The dorsum surface is smooth and shiny, the basic color is reddish or brown-orange, with three wide blue-gray transversal bands. The base is white or light brown, with long teeth furrowing the base (hence the Latin name sulcidentata). The shell is quite similar to Lyncina schilderorum, Lyncina carneola and Lyncina ventriculus. In the living cowries mantle is brownish, with long bluish tree-shaped sensorial papillae. Mantle and foot are well developed, with external antennae. The lateral flaps of the mantle may hide completely the shell surface and may be quickly retracted into the shell.

Distribution
This species is endemic to the Hawaiian Islands.

Habitat
These cowries live on coral reef in tropical intertidal and subtidal water up to 40 metres. They can be found in ledges and small coral caves at night, as they start feeding only at dusk.

Subspecies
Cypraea sulcidentata var. xanthochrysa Melvill, 1888

References
 Lorenz F. & Hubert A. (2000) A guide to worldwide cowries. Edition 2. Hackenheim: Conchbooks. 584 pp
 World Register of Marine Species (WORMS) - Lyncina sulcidentata

External links
 Biolib
 Underwater
 

Cypraeidae
Gastropods described in 1824
Taxa named by John Edward Gray